Nyêtang (Tibetan: མཉེས་ཐང་) is a village in Qüxü County in the Lhasa Prefecture in the Tibet Autonomous Region of China. It is located approximately 12 miles south-west of Lhasa.

See also
List of towns and villages in Tibet
Nyethang Drolma Lhakhang Temple

Populated places in Lhasa (prefecture-level city)
Township-level divisions of Tibet
Qüxü County